John Mills Allen (July 8, 1846 – October 30, 1917), known as "Private John" Allen, was an American lawyer and Confederate soldier during the  Civil War. He was also a member of the United States House of Representatives for eight consecutive terms from Mississippi from 1885 to 1901.

Biography 
Allen was born in Tishomingo County, Mississippi on July 8, 1846. He attended the common schools during the Civil War, enlisted as a private in the Confederate Army, and served throughout the war. Allen also attended Cumberland School of Law in Lebanon, Tennessee, and graduated from the law department of the University of Mississippi in 1870. Allen was admitted to the bar the same year and commenced practice in Tupelo, Mississippi.

Allen served as district attorney for the first judicial district of Mississippi from 1875 to 1879.

Congress 
He was elected as a Democrat to the Forty-ninth and to the seven succeeding Congresses (March 4, 1885 – March 3, 1901). He gained the nickname "Private John" Allen campaigning for Congress.  He was a private throughout the Civil War, and proud of it.  In one campaign he ran against a former general.  He said that everyone who served as a general in the civil war should vote for the general, " . . . and all of you who were privates and stood guard over the generals while they slept, vote for Private John Allen!"  Allen won in a landslide and was thereafter known as "Private John" Allen.

Allen served as chairman of the Committee of Expenditures in the Department of Justice (Fifty-second Congress), and of the Committee on Levees and Improvements of the Mississippi River (Fifty-third Congress).

Later career and death 
Allen declined to be a candidate for reelection in 1900 to the Fifty-seventh Congress and then he was appointed in March 1901 as United States commissioner to the St. Louis Exposition of 1904. Afterwards he resumed the practice of law in Tupelo, Mississippi, and died there October 30, 1917. 

He was interred in Glenwood Cemetery.

References

Bibliography
Faries, Clyde J. "The Rhetoric of Private John Allen." Ph.D. diss., University of Missouri, 1965; Gentry, Claude. Private John Allen: Gentleman, Statesman, Sage, Prophet. Baldwyn, Miss: The author, 1951.

External links

1846 births
1917 deaths
19th-century American politicians

Democratic Party members of the United States House of Representatives from Mississippi